Alta Township is a civil township in Barnes County, North Dakota, United States. As of the 2000 census, its population was 98. The township is named after Alta Ridge, a moraine belt overlooking the Sheyenne River Valley.

Cities and populated places

References

Townships in Barnes County, North Dakota
Townships in North Dakota